Argyresthia hilfiella is a moth of the  family Yponomeutidae. It is found in Greece.

The wingspan is about 10.5 mm.

References

Moths described in 1910
Argyresthia
Moths of Europe